Inland follows up Standing on a Hummingbird as Mark Templeton's second full-length solo album. Inland was released May 11, 2009, by the electronic music label Anticipate Recordings hailing out of New York City.

Track listing
"At Your Feet" – 3:52
"Oak" – 4:12
"Their Light Reflected" – 4:06
"Please Take Me" - 4:13
"Sleep In Front Of" – 5:16
"West Of Fabric pt. 1" – 4:36
"West Of Fabric pt. 2" – 1:15
"Under" – 3:51
"Even You Can Tell" – 2:46
"Seam" – 5:32
"Beginnings" – 3:05

External links
Mark Templeton's website
Anticipate Recordings' website

2009 albums
Mark Templeton (electronic musician) albums